The Legislative Branch of Government in Colombia is one of the three branches of the government of Colombia under the Constitutional provision of separation of powers. The legislative branch of government is represented by the Congress of Colombia, which is formed by the Senate of Colombia and the Chamber of Representatives. Both houses of Congress are further subdivided into commissions (committees) and "sub commissions" to discuss determined subjects.

References

External links
 Official site: https://www.senado.gov.co/

Government of Colombia
Legislative branch of Colombia